Digambar Parashuram Dandekar (December 27, 1907 – October 11, 1994) was an Indian sociologist and entrepreneur, best known for his research on population trends in Chicago and Northwestern Indiana, his autobiography A Travel on Camel (1977), and for co-founding the Camlin stationary company in 1931 with his brother.

References 

1907 births
1994 deaths
Indian sociologists
Indian writers
Indian businesspeople